xB Machine is a discontinued  virtual operating system that is small enough to fit on a USB drive. The last version seems to have been 0.9.1.5 in mid-2008. It brought a secure computing environment that anonymized all internet activity, and had portable encrypted file storage. It had been developed and offered by XeroBank and based on a modified Gentoo Linux distribution. It could be executed as a virtual machine through a QEMU hypervisor, VMWare, VirtualBox, and any other major virtualization system. It could also be booted from on USB or burned to CD for booting. Virtualization, along with the native implementation of a Tor onion routing for internet connectivity and other encryption and privacy tools, had been utilized to increase the security and anonymity of the user.
The developers claimed that it is the most secure operating system in the world
and that the technology involved is highly resistant to hacking and spying, even in the most hostile environments. The details and transactions inside each xB Machine account were protected with 256-bit AES encryption. The software also had a self-destruct sequence for eliminating any traces that a user may have left behind on the drivespace after using xB Machine. Meanwhile, Xerobank offers a modular package with xB Browser, xB Mail, and xB VPN, parts of it running only for customers of the bank.

Features of XB Machine include:

LiveCD or bootable ISO on Windows, Linux and Mac OS X
CD-Rom/USB/HDD Bootable
Internalized QEMU
VMware detection and support
KQEMU accelerator kernel module
Includes xB Browser (Firefox with inbuilt Tor network)
Includes xB Mail (generic Thunderbird ATM)
Torrent support via 
Self-Destruct

References

Discontinued Linux distributions
Linux distributions